Adele Goodman Clark (September 27, 1882 – June 4, 1983) was an American artist and suffragist.

Early life
Clark was born in 1882 in Montgomery, Alabama to Robert Clark, a railroad worker originally from Belfast, and Estelle Goodman Clark, a Jewish music teacher originally from New Orleans. She was the sister of fellow suffragist Edith Clark Cowles.

The family lived in New Orleans, Louisiana and Pass Christian, Mississippi before moving to Richmond, Virginia in 1894. Clark attended the Virginia Randolph Ellett School and, at age 19, worked as a stenographer to fund art classes at the Art Club of Richmond. In 1906, she went to the New York School of Art on a scholarship, studying under artists including Robert Henri, William Merritt Chase, and Kenneth Hayes Miller.

Activism
Clark's activist career began in 1909, when she and 18 other women, including Nora Houston, Ellen Glasgow, Lila Meade Valentine, Kate Waller Barrett, and Mary Johnston, founded the Equal Suffrage League of Virginia; she served as its secretary for one year, and also as a committee chair and head of the group's lobby in the Virginia General Assembly.

In 1910, she was a delegate to the National American Woman Suffrage Association convention in Washington, D.C. Clark and Nora Houston would set up also set up their easels at the corner of Fifth and Broad Streets in downtown Richmond to share their "street corner sketches"—chalk drawings on rolls of paper that illustrated their oratory. "Lots of people made speeches, but we were the only ones sketching, and that really drew crowds," Clark once remembered. During their chalk talks, Clark and Houston spoke about women's suffrage and handed out leaflets to people who approached.

When the Art Club of Richmond dissolved in 1917, Clark and Houston opened a studio together. The professional space became known as the "Atelier," and its class offerings—including art history, painting, and drawing—fostered the talents of a new generation of artists, including the painter Theresa Pollak. Two years later, Clark and Houston founded the Virginia Academy of Fine Arts and Handicrafts. In the months before the 1920 elections, when there were threats and rumors of spurious challenges against black women voters, Clark and Houston invited black leaders to their studio to plan ways to confront the issue. They decided that the white suffragists would patrol polling locations in cars. Clark and Houston continued to be involved in the interracial movement after this election. They also participated in art-related activism, campaigning for the resurrection of the Academy of Sciences and Fine Arts, which opened in 1930 as the Richmond Academy of Arts and later became the Virginia Museum of Fine Arts.

When women were given the vote in 1920, the Equal Suffrage League became the Virginia League of Women Voters, and Clark was its first chair before becoming president the next year. She was its president from 1921 to 1925, and then again from 1929 to 1944. Clark was elected to the board of the National League of Women Voters in 1924 as a regional director, and in 1925 she was elected Second Vice-President, a position she held until 1928. Also in 1928, Clark and Houston bought a house together on Chamberlayne Avenue in Richmond, which came to be known as "The Brattery."

Government and educational positions
Clark also held positions in a number of government and educational bodies, including secretary of Governor E. Lee Trinkle's Commission on the Simplification of State and Local Government and of Governor Harry F. Byrd's Liberal Arts College for Women Commission, and dean of women at the College of William and Mary. During the New Deal, she was a field supervisor for the National Reemployment Service before becoming, in 1936, the director of the Virginia Arts Project in the Works Progress Administration.

She was on the Virginia Arts Commission from 1941 to 1964, having helped establish it in 1916. Clark, who also put her campaign for women's suffrage into her artistic work, commented that her art and her activism were related, saying, "I've always tried to combine my interest in art with my interest in government."

Personal life
She met fellow artist Nora Houston at the Art School of Richmond, where she had previously taken classes under Lillie Logan and where she taught after returning to Virginia. Houston became Clark's life partner until her death in 1942. Soon after Nora Houston died in 1942, Clark's cousin Willoughby Ions, also an artist, moved in with Clark at the Chamberlayne Avenue house she had shared with Houston.

Clark, an Episcopalian, converted to Roman Catholicism, Houston's religion, on November 21, 1942.  Clark chaired the Richmond Diocesan Council of Catholic Women's Legislative Committee from 1949 to 1959. She continued to be outspoken on political issues, opposing the Equal Rights Amendment in the belief that it was unnecessary.

Clark died in a retirement community in Richmond, Virginia, on June 4, 1983, aged 100.

See also
 List of suffragists and suffragettes

References

External links
 
Documenting the American South: Oral History Interview with Adele Clark, February 28, 1964. Audio and transcripts.
Adèle Clark, Artist and Activist. Online exhibit, Virginia Commonwealth University Libraries
Finding Aid to the Adele Clark Papers, Special Collections and Archives, James Branch Cabell Library, VCU Libraries, Richmond, Virginia.
Find A Grave memorial page.

1882 births
1983 deaths
20th-century American painters
20th-century American women artists
American centenarians
American suffragists
American women painters
American women's rights activists
American arts administrators
Women arts administrators
College of William & Mary faculty
Converts to Roman Catholicism from Anglicanism
Federal Art Project administrators
Federal Art Project artists
LGBT people from Alabama
Parsons School of Design alumni
Activists from Montgomery, Alabama
Artists from Richmond, Virginia
Students of Robert Henri
Works Progress Administration in Virginia
Virginia suffrage
Women centenarians
LGBT people from Virginia
American anti-poll tax activists
Catholics from Virginia
Episcopalians from Alabama
LGBT Anglicans
LGBT Roman Catholics
American people of Irish descent
American people of Jewish descent
American lesbian artists